Michael W. Brown (born April 29, 1979) is a Canadian former professional ice hockey winger. In his seven-year career, he played for the Vancouver Canucks, Mighty Ducks of Anaheim and Chicago Blackhawks in the National Hockey League (NHL).

Early life
Born in Surrey, British Columbia, Brown played five years of major junior hockey in the Western Hockey League (WHL) with the Red Deer Rebels and Kamloops Blazers.

Career 
Brown was drafted 20th overall by the Florida Panthers in the 1997 NHL Entry Draft. He made his professional debut with the Syracuse Crunch of the American Hockey League (AHL) in the 1999–2000 season. His NHL debut came when he appeared in a single game for the Vancouver Canucks during the 2000–01 season. He would play 15 more games with the Canucks in the 2001–02 season.

Brown joined the Mighty Ducks of Anaheim in the 2002–03 season, during which he scored his only NHL goal. He then appeared in two games with the Chicago Blackhawks during the 2005–06 season before retiring.

Brown became the general manager of Barnes Harley-Davidson in Langley.  He is active with the Vancouver Canucks Alumni and is frequently heard on podcasts.

Career statistics

External links
 

1979 births
Binghamton Senators players
Canadian ice hockey forwards
Chicago Blackhawks players
Cincinnati Mighty Ducks players
Florida Panthers draft picks
Ice hockey people from British Columbia
Kamloops Blazers players
Kansas City Blades players
Living people
Manitoba Moose players
Merritt Centennials players
Mighty Ducks of Anaheim players
National Hockey League first-round draft picks
Norfolk Admirals players
Red Deer Rebels players
St. John's Maple Leafs players
Sportspeople from Surrey, British Columbia
Syracuse Crunch players
Vancouver Canucks players